Doucas and Kapetanakis pigmented purpura is a skin condition characterized by scaly and eczematous patches, which also have petechiae and hemosiderin staining.

It is a lymphocytic capillaritis of unknown cause. Lesions consist of erythematous and purpuric macules which usually begin around the ankles, coalesce, and spread to involve the whole legs, and sometimes the trunk and upper extremities. The lesions are extremely pruritic (itchy) and occasionally lichenified after prolonged scratching.

It is also known as "eczematoid purpura" or "eczematoid-like purpura".

It was characterized in 1953.

See also 
 Pigmentary purpuric eruptions
 List of cutaneous conditions

References

External links 

Vascular-related cutaneous conditions